Aldershot station may refer to:
Aldershot railway station, Aldershot, England, United Kingdom
Aldershot GO Station, Burlington, Ontario, Canada